Warner Walton Cope (January 31, 1824 – January 17, 1903), also known as W. W. Cope, was the sixth Chief Justice of California.

Biography
Born in Kentucky, Cope came to California in 1850 and tried mining, but found little success. In 1853 he resumed work as an attorney, first in El Dorado County and the next year in Jackson, Amador County. In October 1858, he was elected to the California State Assembly from Amador as a Democrat.

In June 1859 he was nominated by Alvinza Hayward, also of Amador County, to be the candidate of the Democratic Lecompton Party for associate justice of the Supreme Court of California.  In September 1859, he was elected, but before his term was to begin he was appointed by Governor John B. Weller to fill a vacancy on the court starting September 20, 1859, when David S. Terry resigned to fight a duel. He became Chief Justice on March 11, 1863, filling the vacancy after President Abraham Lincoln appointed Stephen J. Field to the U.S. Supreme Court. Cope himself left the court at the end of that year when a constitutional amendment required new judicial elections.

In 1877, Cope was a judge on the Fourth District Court. In 1880, he was a delegate to the Democratic Party state convention. In 1883, Cope became the California Reporter of Decisions, and in March 1885 was appointed to a four-year term as commissioner of the Supreme Court.

After leaving the court, Cope returned to private practice until about 1893, when he retired to Contra Costa County, where he raised nuts and fruit. He died in San Francisco on January 17, 1903.

Bar activities
From 1880 to 1885, Cope was president of the San Francisco Bar Association.

Personal life
On April 19, 1845, Cope married Martha Ann Neal in Shelby County, Kentucky. He traveled to California in 1850, and his wife followed in 1856. They had three sons and three daughters. One of his sons, Walter B. Cope, was a Santa Barbara County Superior Court judge and a prominent California lawyer in the firm of Morrison, Cope & Brobeck.  Like his father, Walter also served as president of the San Francisco Bar Association, from 1906 to 1909.

References

External links
 
 In Memoriam W. W. Cope. 140 Cal. Rpts. 714 (1904). California Supreme Court Historical Society. Retrieved July 18, 2017.
 Past & Present Justices. California State Courts. Retrieved July 19, 2017.

See also
 List of justices of the Supreme Court of California
 California Reporter of Decisions
 Stephen Johnson Field
 Joseph G. Baldwin
 Edward Norton
 Edwin B. Crocker

1819 births
1903 deaths
Chief Justices of California
Justices of the Supreme Court of California
People from Jackson, California
Lawyers from San Francisco
U.S. state supreme court judges admitted to the practice of law by reading law
19th-century American politicians
19th-century American judges
19th-century American lawyers
Democratic Party members of the California State Assembly
People of the California Gold Rush
California pioneers
People from Shelby County, Kentucky